Smaragdinella calyculata, also called calyx bubble shell, is a small shelled slug common on rocky shores in the Indo-Pacific including Hawaii.

References

 Gosliner, T. (1987). Nudibranchs of Southern Africa: A Guide to Opisthobranch Molluscs of Southern Africa. Sea Challengers, Monterey, California.

External links
 Quoy, J. R. C. & Gaimard, J. P. (1832-1835). Voyage de la corvette l'Astrolabe : exécuté par ordre du roi, pendant les années 1826-1827-1828-1829, sous le commandement de M. J. Dumont d'Urville. Zoologie.
 Broderip, W. J. & Sowerby, G. B. I. (1829). Observations on new or interesting Mollusca contained, for the most part, in the Museum of the Zoological Society. Zoological Journal. 4: 359-379, pl. 9
 Adams, A. (1847). Notes on certain molluscous animals. Proceedings of the Zoological Society of London. 1847: 19–24.
  Adams, A. (1850). Monograph of the family Bullidae. In G. B. Sowerby II (ed.), Thesaurus conchyliorum, or monographs of genera of shells. Vol. 2 (11): 553-608, pls 119-125. London
  Gray, J. E. (1850). [text. In: Gray, M. E., Figures of molluscous animals, selected from various authors. Longman, Brown, Green and Longmans, London. Vol. 4, iv + 219 pp. (August)]
 Sowerby, G. B. II. (1870). Monograph of the Genus Linteria. In: Conchologia Iconica, or illustrations of the shells of molluscous animals, vol. 18, plate and unpaginated text. L. Reeve & Co., London.
 Quoy, J. R. C. & Gaimard, J. P. (1832-1835). Voyage de la corvette l'Astrolabe : exécuté par ordre du roi, pendant les années 1826-1827-1828-1829, sous le commandement de M. J. Dumont d'Urville. Zoologie.
 Adams, A. (1850). Monograph of the family Bullidae. In G. B. Sowerby II (ed.), Thesaurus conchyliorum, or monographs of genera of shells. Vol. 2 (11): 553-608, pls 119-125. London, privately published.
 Yonow N. & Jensen K.R. (2018). Results of the Rumphius Biohistorical Expedition to Ambon (1990). Part 17. The Cephalaspidea, Anaspidea, Pleurobranchia, and Sacoglossa (Mollusca: Gastropoda: Heterobranchia). Archiv für Molluskenkunde. 147(1): 1-48

Haminoeidae
Molluscs of Hawaii
Gastropods described in 1829